Kelk in Iran may refer to:
 Kelk, Iranshahr
 Kelk, Zahedan